Vincent Raphaël Charles Desagnat (born 9 March 1976) is a French actor, skateboarder and, television and radio presenter.

Life and career 
Vincent Desagnat was born in Paris, the youngest son of director and screenwriter Jean-Pierre Desagnat, grandson of actress Francia Séguy, brother of director and screenwriter François Desagnat and of producer and director assistant Olivier Desagnat.

He began his career in 1998 appearing in a music video of French band Manau directed by his brother, and later playing a small role in an episode of series H.

He then became a radio presenter on Fun Radio and Radio Nova, and co-hosted with Benjamin Morgaine and Michaël Youn the humoristic morning program Morning Live broadcast simultaneously on M6 and Fun TV from July 2000 to March 2002.

In 2002, he released with Benjamin Morgaine and Michaël Youn an album from that program under the name of Bratisla Boys, a parodic boys band issued from one of their sketches on M6. In 2003, the trio released a second album under the name of Conards, for the soundtrack of the film Les 11 commandements. The trio later reunited to create a parody of a rap group named Fatal Bazooka.

From October 2006 to March 2013, he presents and comments with Benjamin Morgaine the program Menu W9 on W9, a condensed version of the Japanese game shows and contests Sushi TV, Takeshi's Castle, Ninja Warrior et Viking: The Ultimate Obstacle Course. He then presented from September 2013 to June 2015 the entertaining program Show ! Le Matin on D17.

Desagnat has appeared in numerous films, including Les 11 commandements, Babysitting, and its sequel Babysitting 2.

Television programs 
 2000–02 : Morning Live on M6 with Michaël Youn and Benjamin Morgaine
 2006–13 : Menu W9 on W9 with Benjamin Morgaine
 2013–15 : Show ! Le matin on D17

Filmography

Theater

References

External links 

1976 births
French male film actors
French male television actors
French television presenters
French radio presenters
Mass media people from Paris
Living people
French skateboarders